Chun Nan Jun (CNJ) is the common name for the company also called Ziyang Nanjun Automobile Co., Ltd and Sichuan Nanjun Automobile Co., Ltd; it is a Chinese truck manufacturer based in Yanjiang, Ziyang, Sichuan, with over 3,200 employees. Ziyang Nanjun Automobile produces heavy, medium and light duty trucks and mini trucks as well as large, medium and light buses. Annual production capacity is 150,000 automobiles presently, ranking the 19th in China's auto industry and the second in China's commercial vehicle industry.

Subsidiaries

Sichuan Nanjun Automobile Co., Ltd., produces public buses and highway passenger vehicles;

Ziyang Junxing Spare Parts Co., Ltd., produces spare parts;

Ziyang Ruiyu Logistics Co., Ltd., is mainly engaged in storage, logistics, property management and transportation of commodity vehicles;

Hunan Axle (Ziyang) Co., Ltd., produces axles annually for medium and light duty vehicles;

CNJ Automobile Chongqing Banglong Import & Export Co., Ltd., is the official corporate exporter

Joint Ventures
In 2011 CNC signed a joint venture with Hyundai to produce Hyundai trucks and buses. Each entity would hold 50% of the JV named Sichuan Hyundai,.

Export

See also

References

External links
 Chinese Corporate site
 English corporate site

Bus manufacturers of China
Vehicle manufacturing companies established in 1958
Truck manufacturers of China
1958 establishments in China